Sir Ralph Daniel Makinson Littler, CB, KC, JP, DL (2 October 1835 – 23 November 1908) was a British barrister and magistrate. He was the Chairman of the Middlesex Quarter Sessions until his death in 1908.

Biography 
The son of Rev. Robert Littler and Sarah Makinson, Ralph Littler was educated at University College School and University College London, where he was Common Law Prizeman. He was called to the Bar by the Inner Temple in 1857, and joined the Middle Temple in 1870, becoming a Bencher in 1882 and Treasurer in 1901.

Littler practised on the Northern, then the North-East circuits as a junior, He became a Queen's Counsel in 1873, then mainly practised at the Parliamentary Bar. For many years, he was in the public eye as Chairman of the Middlesex Quarter Sessions. He was known for his severity, once sentencing a man to five years' penal servitude for the theft of a penny, though the circumstances were particularly egregious.

He was appointed a Companion of the Order of the Bath in 1890 and was knighted in 1902.

References 

 "Obituary: Sir Ralph Littler", The Times, 24 November 1908, p. 13.

1835 births
1908 deaths
19th-century British lawyers
Knights Bachelor
English King's Counsel
19th-century King's Counsel
20th-century King's Counsel
Companions of the Order of the Bath
Members of the Inner Temple
Members of the Middle Temple
20th-century English judges
Deputy Lieutenants of the City of London
People educated at University College School
Alumni of University College London
English justices of the peace
19th-century English judges